Lanham is an unincorporated community and census-designated place in Prince George's County, Maryland. As of the 2020 United States Census it had a population of 11,282. The New Carrollton station (the terminus of the Washington Metro's Orange Line) as well as an Amtrak station are across the Capital Beltway in New Carrollton, Maryland. Doctors Community Hospital is located in Lanham.

History
The Thomas J. Calloway House was listed on the National Register of Historic Places in 2005.

Geography

Government and infrastructure
Prince George's County Police Department District 2 Station in Brock Hall CDP, with a Bowie postal address, serves the community.

The U.S. Postal Service operates the Lanham Seabrook Post Office in Lanham CDP.

Economy
EdTech company 2U (Nasdaq: REVU), Shoppers Food & Pharmacy, reverse logistics company Optoro, software company Vocus, media company Radio One and publisher Rowman & Littlefield are based in Lanham.

Demographics

2020 census

Note: the US Census treats Hispanic/Latino as an ethnic category. This table excludes Latinos from the racial categories and assigns them to a separate category. Hispanics/Latinos can be of any race.

Religion
 Grace Church
 Grace Presbyterian Church
 Trinity Reformed Presbyterian Church (Orthodox Presbyterian Church)
 Lanham Evangelical Lutheran Church in America (ELCA)
 Lanham United Methodist Church
 Murugan Temple of North America
 Prince George's Muslim Association
 Sri Siva Vishnu Temple
 St. Theodore Greek Orthodox Church
 Diyanet Center of America
  Kingdom Hall for Jehovah's Witnesses
 New Dimensions Church
 Korean Maryland Presbyterian Church

Education
Prince George's County Public Schools serves Lanham CDP.

Residents of the CDP are divided between James McHenry Elementary School and Seabrook Elementary School. All residents are zoned to Thomas Johnson Middle School and DuVal High School.

There is a private Catholic school, Academy of Saint Matthias the Apostle.

Other area schools:

Elementary schools
 Catherine T. Reed Elementary School
 Gaywood Elementary School
 Magnolia Elementary School
 Robert Goddard Montessori School
Blue
Middle schools
 Robert Goddard Montessori

Colleges
 Washington Bible College/Capital Bible Seminary/Equip Institute

Notable people
 Antoine Brooks, NFL player and Super Bowl LVI champion
 Daryl Ferguson, Barbadian footballer
 Robert Griffith, former NFL strong safety 
 Frank Kratovil, former US Congressman
 Jermaine Lewis, former NFL wide receiver 
 Guy S. Meloy Jr., former US Army general
 Chinanu Onuaku (born 1996), basketball player
 Lio Rush, professional wrestler

References

 
Census-designated places in Maryland
Census-designated places in Prince George's County, Maryland